Pink Lady Lemonade ~ You're from Inner Space is an album by Acid Mothers Temple & the Melting Paraiso U.F.O. released by Alien8 Recordings on April 5, 2011. The album is available on CD or as a limited edition double-LP on color vinyl (either yellow or pink/black, 500 copies per color), with artwork by Felix Morel.

Track listing

References

Acid Mothers Temple albums
2011 albums